Sammanthurai, is a town in Ampara District of Eastern Province of Sri Lanka. It lies between the towns of Ampara and Karaitivu along the A31 road. It is surrounded by paddy fields and it is renowned for its rice paddies and its inner harbour from ancient times.

Sammanthurai is the birthplace of M. H. M. Ashraff, known as "The Kingmaker" and the founder of the Sri Lanka Muslim Congress political party.

History 
Sammanthurai is an important and historical place of Sri Lanka. It was the first place where Dutch people arrived in Sri Lanka. Sammanthurai derives its name from ‘Sampan,’ the vessel, Thurai , the Harbor or port and the sailor of Sampan called as 'Hambankaraya' (Sinhala) or  ‘Sammankaran’(Tamil) who were Muslims from India who came for the trade.

Demographics 
Sammanthurai has a population of 77,284 (2021),  Islam is the dominant religion in the town. There is a small Hindu minority, particularly in the Veeramunai area, Small number of Christian and Buddhist are also there. The majority are Tamil speaking Muslims and a few speak Sinhala and English. Sammanthurai is home to many victims of the Tsunami of 2004.

Source:statistics.gov.lk

Climate 
Being close to the equator, Sammanthurai enjoys a tropical wet and dry climate. Summer prevails in the months of May, June, July, and August. Days in June are the hottest period, with temperatures regularly reaching 30 °C. Monsoons occur in November, December and January. Sammanthurai receives most of its rainfall from the Northeast Monsoon.

Education 

Sammanthurai has a number of post-secondary institutions. In addition to the Faculty of Applied Science campus of the South Eastern University of Sri Lanka, there are two colleges granting diplomas and certificates in Sammanthurai: Technical College and Vocational Training Center. The town is also home to two Arabic colleges: Sammanthurai Thableekul Islam and Markaz Darul Iman.

The Sammanthurai Zonal Education Office (STRZEO) operates 70 public schools in an area of 257 km2 and there are 26,039 students attending school  the Sammanthurai sub zone have 36 Schools and there are  two 1 AB Schools in Sammanthurai. Str/ Sammanthurai Muslim Madya Maha Vidyalaya, STR/Al -Marjan Muslim Ladies College, STR/ Dharussalam Maha Vidyalaya and STR/Al-Arsath Maha Vidyalaya are the four major School where the students populations is over 1000.

There are four public libraries are running under the local government.  Main Amir Ali Public Library has more than 10,000 books and journals.

Economy 

Traditionally Sammanthuraiyans (natives of Sammanthurai) rely on farming. Agriculture is the most important source of income and paddy is the major crop cultivated in 55,000 acres. Other sources of revenue include the service sector and small businesses.

Culture 
Sammanthurai culture is strongly influenced by Islamic thoughts. Life in Sammanthurai revolves around the prayer calls (Adhan). The people, particularly women, heavily depend on Adhan to keep their regular activities on track. The Adhan for early morning prayer well before sunrise acts as a wake-up alarm. It is followed by four prayer calls throughout the day. Friday is observed as spiritual day and the month of Ramadan (month of fasting) is observed as a spiritual month in Sammanthurai like in any Muslim country. Eid Al-Fitr and Eid al-Adha are the two festivals celebrated here.

Islam and the people 
As many as 45 Masjids and 6 Shrines are in Sammanthurai. Sammanthurai houses two religious institutions: the Thablighul Islam Arabic College, Hifz Madrasa and a Markaz Darul Iman (Arabic College)

Transport and communication 
This town is well connected via road with major towns and cities in Sri Lanka. A31 road runs through Sammanthurai. Bus service is available to the nearby cities of Kalmunai, Ampara and Batticaloa. The state-owned Sri Lanka Transport Board provides regular passenger services.

Approximate distance from other cities and towns

Infrastructure 
Sammanthurai houses a government hospital along with private hospitals/clinics. The police station serves the town as well as the surrounding villages. Government establishments like the post office, magistrates' court, Pradeshiya Shaba, Ceylon Electricity Board, Sri Lanka Transport Board Bus Depot, Rice Research Station and  Divisional Secretariats of Sri Lanka are based in the town.

In addition, Group Action For Social Order (GAFSO) and Centre for Peace Studies (CPS) Sri Lanka are the national non-governmental organizations (NGOs) headquartered in Sammanthurai.

Sports 
Sammanthurai is home to a sports complex, a public playground and many public school playgrounds. Cricket is the most popular sport as it is the most popular sport in the country.

Environmental issues 
The post-tsunami and post-war development activities and subsequent resettlement programs have contributed to air pollution in this area. In addition, solid waste generation, contaminated water and mosquito breeding, have caused much damage to peoples’ health. The dusty air with bad odour has become a major threat to the daily lives of inhabitants of Sammanthurai.

References

External links 

Towns in Ampara District
Sammanthurai DS Division